Bogdan Brunon Wenta (born 19 November 1961) is a Polish politician and handball coach and former Polish and German handball player. He has been a member of the Poland men's national handball team in 1981–1994 and Germany men's national handball team in 1997–2000, a participant of the Olympic Games Sydney 2000, five-time Polish Champion (1984, 1985, 1986, 1987, 1988), and former head coach of Poland. He has been one of the best handball player in the history of Polish handball. Between 2014 and 2018 he was a Member of the European Parliament for the Polish Civic Platform. In 2018, he was elected as Mayor of Kielce, having run from his own committee with the endorsement of the Civic Platform.

Personal life

Since 1984 he has been married to Iwona. They have one son Tomasz (born 13 March 1996). In 2014 Bogdan Wenta was elected to European Parliament.

Career as player

Clubs
Wenta's entire career in Poland was connected with one club - Wybrzeże Gdańsk, where he started playing in first team in 1978, when he was 17. He was five-times Polish Champion (1984–1988) and achieved European Cup final twice, losing to RK Metaloplastika Šabac in 1986 and SKA Mińsk in 1987. In 1989 he moved to Spain and played for Bidasoa Irún (1989–1992) and FC Barcelona Handbol (1992–1995). He was first Polish player in FC Barcelona. At last, he emigrated to Germany, and played for TuS Nettelstedt (1995–1998) and SG Flensburg-Handewitt (1998–2000).

National teams

Poland 1981–1993
Wenta made his debut in Polish national team in 1981, when he was barely 20. He was appointed by Zygfryd Kuchta. It was match with Switzerland. He represented Poland in 185 official games (including friendly matches 198) and scored 763 goals, which is the third result in history of Polish handball.

He took part in IHF World Handball Championship twice - in 1986 (14th place) and 1990 (11th place). He did not participate in Olympic Games as Polish player. In 1993 he was blamed for Poland's elimination during qualifications to 1994 European Men's Handball Championship. Since then he was never called up again to Polish national team.

Germany 1997–2000
In 1996 Wenta accepted German citizenship, which caused a lot of controversy in his homeland, Poland. However he has never played against Poland. He represented the German side in 46 official games (and 4 friendly matches) and scored 144 goals. He was a member of German national team in IHF World Handball Championship twice - 1997 and 1999. In 1998 he achieved bronze medal of European Championship and took part in European Championship 2000. He made his Olympic debut at Olympics Sydney 2000 (5th place).

He regained Polish citizenship in 2008.

Career as coach, 2000–2012
Bogdan Wenta retired in 2000 and became coach assistant in SG Flensburg-Handewitt. In 2005 he had to enter the court and play because of many players had injuries. He was 44 and this number was on his shirt.

From summer 2006 to autumn 2007 he was head coach of German handball club, SC Magdeburg.

On 28 October 2004 Wenta was announced as Poland men's national handball team head coach. In 2007 he achieved with national team the biggest success of Polish handball - Poland won silver medal of World Championship. They lost the final to host team - Germany 25:29. In 2008 Poland took the fifth place by defeating Russia 29:28 at 2008 Summer Olympics, held in Beijing. In 2009 Poland led by him achieved second medal of IHF World Handball Championship. They won the bronze medal by defeating Denmark 31:23 at World Championship 2009 in Croatia. In January 2010 he was awarded Coach of Year 2009 by Plebiscite of Przegląd Sportowy. In 2012 national team did not qualify to Olympic Games. On April 19, 2012, he announced his resignation.

 2007  EHF Cup, with SC Magdeburg
 2007  IHF World Championship, with Poland
 2009  IHF World Championship, with Poland
 2009  Polish Cup, with Vive Targi Kielce
 2009  Polish Championship, with Vive Targi Kielce
 2010  Polish Cup, with Vive Targi Kielce
 2010  Polish Championship, with Vive Targi Kielce
 2011  Polish Cup, with Vive Targi Kielce
 2011  Polish Championship, with Vive Targi Kielce
 2012  Polish Cup, with Vive Targi Kielce
 2012  Polish Championship, with Vive Targi Kielce
 2013  Polish Cup, with Vive Targi Kielce
 2013  Polish Championship, with Vive Targi Kielce
 2013  EHF Champions League, with Vive Targi Kielce

Involvement in politics, 2014–present
Wenta was a Member of the European Parliament elected in  the 2014 European elections. In European Parliament, he served on the Committee on Culture and Education and on the Committee on Development. In addition to his committee assignments, he was a member of the Parliament's delegation to the ACP–EU Joint Parliamentary Assembly. In 2018, he quit his membership in the European Parliament after being elected as Mayor of Kielce in 2018 Polish local elections.

Other activities
 European Endowment for Democracy (EED), Member of the Board of Governors

Sporting achievements

Clubs

National championships
 1981/1982  Polish Championship, with Wybrzeże Gdańsk
 1982/1983  Polish Championship, with Wybrzeże Gdańsk
 1983/1984  Polish Championship, with Wybrzeże Gdańsk
 1984/1985  Polish Championship, with Wybrzeże Gdańsk
 1985/1986  Polish Championship, with Wybrzeże Gdańsk
 1986/1987  Polish Championship, with Wybrzeże Gdańsk
 1987/1988  Polish Championship, with Wybrzeże Gdańsk
 1990/1991  Spanish Cup, with Bidasoa Irún
 1992/1993  Spanish Cup, with FC Barcelona
 1993/1994  Spanish Championship, with FC Barcelona
 1993/1994  Spanish Cup, with FC Barcelona
 1994/1995  Spanish SuperCup 1994, with FC Barcelona
 1998/1999  German SuperCup 1998, with TuS Nettelstedt-Lübbecke

National team
 1998  European Championship

Individually
 1990 ASOBAL League - The best pair of foreign players with Alfreð Gíslason
 1991 ASOBAL League - The best pair of foreign players with Alfreð Gíslason
 1990 ASOBAL League - Most Valuable Player
 1991 ASOBAL League - Most Valuable Player
 1995 ASOBAL League - Best Playmaker

State awards
 2007  Knight's Cross of Polonia Restituta

References

External links 

1961 births
Living people
People from Starogard County
Sportspeople from Pomeranian Voivodeship
Polish male handball players
German male handball players
Liga ASOBAL players
FC Barcelona Handbol players
Knights of the Order of Polonia Restituta
Polish handball coaches
Handball coaches of international teams
MEPs for Poland 2014–2019
Olympic handball players of Germany
Handball players at the 2000 Summer Olympics
Mayors of places in Poland